Tongues of the Moon is a science fiction novel by American writer Philip José Farmer. Originally released in 1964, the book is an action story, focusing on fighting and combat scenes rather than a complex plot. It was initially printed as a novella in Amazing Stories.

In Tongues of the Moon, colonists on Earth's Moon engage in a small-scale war after a nuclear holocaust on Earth. The warring parties include the Soviet Union, here allied with the United States, and a military faction called the "South Atlantic Axis".
 
The novel was reprinted several times, primarily by Pyramid Books.

External links 
 
Tongues of the Moon at Farmer's official website
Reviews at Farmer's official website

References

1964 American novels
1964 science fiction novels
American science fiction novels
Novels by Philip José Farmer
Works originally published in Amazing Stories
Pyramid Books books